Namorita Prentiss is a superhero appearing in American comic books published by Marvel Comics. She is a mutant clone of her mother, Namora, and a member of the New Warriors. She was killed in the explosion in Stamford that started the Superhero Civil War. A version of her from an alternate universe took her place in the aftermath.

Publication history

Namorita first appeared in Sub-Mariner #50 (June 1972), created by Bill Everett. She mostly served as a supporting character for Namor until she was cast as a founding member of the New Warriors in 1989.  She played a prominent role in the first three volumes of the team's book, and has appeared several times in the solo comics of her Warriors teammate and sometimes-romantic interest Nova.

Fictional character biography

Birth/creation
Namorita's mother, Namora, was the first cousin of Namor, and, like Namor, was a hybrid with superhuman strength and the power of flight by using the ankle wings on her feet. Unlike Namor, her mother was human and her father Atlantean.

Namora's sterility created tension with her husband Talan. Upon meeting Vyrra, an Atlantean scientist who had been exiled for practicing the forbidden science of cloning, she requested that he make a clone of her to which she could give birth. After the clone, Namorita, was born, Talan was killed by an atomic explosion. Consequently, Namora raised the child in Lemuria. 

Namora met her (presumed) death at the hands of Llyra, her rival for the affections of a Lemurian prince. Namora did not reveal to her daughter that she was a clone before her death.

Llyra and Byrrah, another cousin of Namor, decided to deploy Namorita in a plot against Namor, threatening that they would destroy Namora's seemingly dead (but actually only frozen) body if she did not lure Namor into a trap. In her first encounter with Namor since reaching adolescence, Namorita was captured by Byrrah, but rescued by Namor. Namor and Namorita would eventually unite to defeat Llyra and Byrrah. She revealed her past to Namor, and developed an infatuation with Namor. She convinced Namor to free Byrrah. 

When Namorita first visited New York City, Namor introduced her to his long-time friend Betty Dean Prentiss, whom Namorita would eventually consider a guardian and second mother. Namorita used Prentiss for her surname while in the surface world. Betty Prentiss would eventually be killed by Dr. Lemuel Dorcas, Namor's enemy.

Namorita rescued a drowning Wundarr from his people, the Dakkamites. She left him with the Thing as a guardian, and became Wundarr's guardian for a time herself. Namorita was later abducted by Llyra, who nearly succeeded in tricking Namor into killing her. However, Namorita was rescued by him instead.

The New Warriors
Some time later, Namorita enrolled in college at Empire State University. During a trip, she was forced to battle long-time Fantastic Four foe, Terrax. She was joined by five other young superheroes, and after Nita and Nova subdued Terrax by severing his contact with the ground, the six formed the New Warriors. When Namor decided to start a financial empire a short time later, Nita joined him as a member of the board of Oracle, Inc. Around Namor, Namorita was always deferential, but around the Warriors she would act tough.

Namorita, as a New Warrior, aided Thor in battling Juggernaut. She was engulfed and subsequently rescued from Sluj by Namor. She and her fellow Warriors first battled Psionex, then fought the third Star Thief and journeyed to the Blue Area of the Moon, where they encountered the Inhumans Royal Family and the Watcher. Namorita was beaten by Neo-Nazis in Berlin. She escaped to England, where she was reunited with Jacqueline Crichton and Union Jack, and fought Warrior Woman. She then discovered that she was a clone. After being severely beaten by the scavenger known as Sea Urchin, she first swapped her usual green bathing suit for Atlantean armor, then soundly beat the Urchin in a rematch.

When team founder Night Thrasher took a hiatus from the Warriors, Namorita led the team. However, the stress of leading the Warriors, the revelation of her cloned nature, and ruling Atlantis during Namor's absence all proved to be too much for her. She became drunk at a nightclub and left with the leader of the Poison Memories gang, who wanted to gain vengeance against the Warriors. He stole information from Namorita's apartment which was used to kidnap many of the Warriors' family members. After the surviving family members were rescued, Namorita's guilt over the incident forced her to leave the Warriors.

Namorita returned to Atlantis, only to be denied entry as the Atlanteans discovered her clone nature. This seemed to be the final catalyst for Nita. An over-saturation of oxygen, coupled with the DNA Vyrra spliced into her at the time of her creation, caused her to change into a closer version of the original Atlanteans. Because of this, Namorita gave herself the name Kymaera. While fighting alongside the Warriors, she was captured and brainwashed by a terrorist organization, only to be rescued by Night Thrasher (who received a tip from the Mad Thinker).

On one occasion, Namorita became covered with pus-filled boils. Her lover Nova saw her in this state and did not speak in time to reassure the emotionally vulnerable Namorita that his feelings for her had not changed. His hesitation sent her over the edge, and she left. A crestfallen Namorita went to take a shower and, to her surprise, her skin returned to its original pink tone. She also shed her pointed ears, webbed hands, and glassy black eyes. Following this transformation, Namorita continued to mutate and developed new powers. She found that she could secrete burning acid or a paralytic toxin and could become transparent. After her breakup with Nova, Namorita briefly dated Johnny Storm (the Human Torch), and co-ruled Atlantis in a Council of Three with Warlord Seth and the warrior Andromeda. Ultimately, Namorita and Nova came to terms over the break-up.

Civil War

Namorita was among the four New Warriors whose actions sparked the public backlash against masked superheroes which is at the core of Marvel's Civil War. The new Warriors are trying to film a reality show, and find four villains on the FBI Most Wanted List, who they attack. Slamming Nitro into a school bus, Namorita taunted him until he caused a massive explosion. Namorita was within a foot of Nitro when he exploded, killing 612 people.

Subsequently, she was listed as "deceased" on the website revealing the secret identities of the surviving members of the New Warriors, and Speedball is then confirmed as the only survivor of the blast.

Three undercover Atlanteans track down Nitro under orders from Namor to avenge the murder of a member of the Atlantean Royal Family. When the Invisible Woman asks for help from Prince Namor, he tells her that the only reason he would help is due to Namorita's death, and he has already avenged that.

Namorita's remains, along with Dwayne's and Microbe's, are later recovered by the New Warriors and Justice's Counter Initiative team, and given a proper burial. During Hercules' journey to the underworld, Namorita was seen in Erebus gambling for her resurrection.

Realm of Kings

In Nova, a time displaced Namorita was rescued by a time displaced Nova within the Fault, having been summoned alongside time-displaced versions of Mister Fantastic, Black Bolt and Darkhawk by the Sphinx to battle his younger self. Through some sort of paradox after Nova defeated the Sphinx once more, Namorita is brought into his present.

Thanos Imperative
While having slow adjustment to her rebirth, Namorita was kidnapped by the Revengers, a facsimile of the Avengers originating from the Cancerverse, after determining that she was a quantum anomaly. She was later rescued by Nova, and mourned his death after he and Star-Lord stayed behind in the collapsing Cancerverse to contain Thanos. As part of the effort against the Cancerverse, she teamed up with an aged version of her old ally Vance Astrovik, otherwise known as Major Victory.<ref>The Thanos Imperative" #1-6 (2010)</ref>

Powers and abilities
Namorita is a genetically altered clone of her mother, a mutant member of the evolutionary offshoot of the human race called Homo Mermanus. Namorita's powers came from being a hybrid of Atlantean homo mermanus and mutant homo superior physiologies. As such, she has superhuman strength and durability, and all her physical attributes increased further while immersed in water. Namorita's physical attributes decreased the longer she spends time out of water; renewed contact with water immediately restored them to their peak. She had the ability to survive underwater for indefinite periods, and specially developed vision which gave her the ability to see clearly in the murky depths of the ocean. She had a limited empathic rapport with Namor the Sub-Mariner and, like him and her mother, she had ankle wings that granted the power of flight. Unlike her mother or Namor she had some additional powers that seems to be related to her emotional state triggering dormant Atlantean genes. She was able to secrete corrosive acid or paralyzing toxin from her skin and possessed some kind of octopoid camouflage. Namorita had the ability to change her skin color as camouflage (the effect was so convincing it seemed as though she could actually turn invisible).

Namorita was trained in Atlantean methods of hand-to-hand and weapons combat. She speaks English, Atlantean, and Lemurian. She sometimes wears Atlantean battle armor of unknown composition.

 Reception 

 Accolades 

 In 2019, CBR.com ranked Namorita 7th in their "10 Most Powerful Members of The New Warriors" list.
 In 2020, Scary Mommy included Namorita in their "Looking For A Role Model? These 195+ Marvel Female Characters Are Truly Heroic" list.
 In 2022, Screen Rant ranked Namorita 4th in their "Marvel's 10 Most Powerful Aquatic Characters" list and included her in their "10 Non-X-Men Mutants Who Should Join The MCU Next" list.

Other versions

Marvel 1602
In the Marvel 1602, Namorita was called Rita here and was the sister of Numenor (this reality's version of Namor) and lives in Bensaylum (this reality's version of Atlantis).

What If?
Following the demise of the X-Men in the What If? story "What If the X-Men Died on their First Mission?", Namorita joins the Beast's hastily assembled mutant hero team - consisting of herself, Theresa Cassidy (who named herself Banshee in honor of her late father), Rahne Sinclair, James Proudstar, the Scarlet Witch and her brother Quicksilver - to combat Count Nefaria and his Ani-Men, and in the end joins the new X-Men team.

In other media

Television
 Namorita appears in the Spider-Man episode "Wrath of the Sub-Mariner," voiced by B.J. Ward. She ends up sick due to pollution caused by the Kingpin.

Video games
 Namorita appears as a NPC in the game Marvel: Ultimate Alliance, voiced by April Stewart. After people in Atlantis take over the city, she sends out a distress call when they kidnap her cousin Namor. While Namor is wounded, she acts as your guide through the Atlantis levels. There is special dialogue between her and Iceman.
 Namorita appears as a NPC in Marvel: Ultimate Alliance 2'', voiced again by April Stewart. Tony Stark sees the New Warriors TV show on television. When it shows Namorita subduing Nitro, she ends up a victim of his large explosion.

Merchandise 

 Various items have been marketed featuring Namorita.  In June 2007 Wizkids marketed through their Avengers line a Namorita HeroClix figurine with card.  Namorita was featured in Marvel Universe Trading Cards — Series 1 (1990, card #85), Series 2 (1991, card #156), Series 3 (1992, cards #49 and 174), Series 4 (1993, card #22), and Series 5 (1994, card #167).  Namorita was also included in a number of T-shirts, posters, and art prints featuring New Warriors.

References

External links
 Namorita's Bio on Marvel.com
 

Characters created by Bill Everett
Clone characters in comics
Comics characters introduced in 1972
Fictional activists
Fictional characters who can turn invisible
Fictional characters with superhuman durability or invulnerability
Marvel Comics Atlanteans (Homo mermanus)
Marvel Comics characters who can move at superhuman speeds
Marvel Comics characters with superhuman strength
Marvel Comics mutants
Marvel Comics female superheroes